, also known as Tokyo Stadium in AFC Champions League and rugby competitions, is a multi-purpose stadium in Chōfu, Tokyo, Japan. The stadium was founded at Kantō Mura, the redevelopment area formerly used by United States Forces Japan, in March 2001.

It was the first stadium in Japan that sold its naming rights, which went to Ajinomoto Co., Inc. on a five-year, 1.2 billion yen (about 10 million U.S. dollars) contract from March 2003 to February 2008 to name it Ajinomoto Stadium. This contract was renewed in November 2007 and extended by six years for 1.4 billion yen to February 2014; in October 2013, the second renewal extended the term to February 2019.

Overview 

The stadium is the home of J1 League football club FC Tokyo and J2 League football club Tokyo Verdy and is used as the venue of some lower divisions of football leagues. Rugby union games are also held there. For the 2002 FIFA World Cup, Saudi Arabia's national team based their training camp at Chōfu and used the stadium as a main training ground, although it did not host an actual World Cup match.

The stadium is often used for non-sport events, such as concerts and flea markets. It has been used as a shelter for survivors of the 2011 Tōhoku earthquake and tsunami. The stadium was the  rugby venue for the 2020 Summer Olympics. During the Olympics, the stadium was known as Tokyo Stadium due to International Olympic Committee's non-commercialization policy.  The stadium has also been one of the venues for 2019 Rugby World Cup and hosted the opening ceremony, followed by the opening match of the tournament, as well as other 7 matches including Bronze Final.

Site 
The north end of the stadium adjoins the Chofu Airport, while Route 20 runs close to the south end. At the south end is the main gate, which is directly connected by a pedestrian bridge over Route 20.

Stand 
The stand accommodates 49,970 and is divided into two levels; the upper level accommodates 20,600 and the lower level 29,370 (both are all-seated). On each level, the stand is divided into four sections (main, back, north and south sides).

The whole of the upper level, as well as upper tiers of the lower level, is covered by roof, which is made of Teflon (main and back) and polycarbonate (both sides). The main stand houses media and hospitality boxes, VIP rooms and reception hall. Two large LED displays are installed at both sides.

Ground
The ground was originally designed for both athletics and football games. However, the construction of the supplementary ground, which is needed for compliance with 1st-grade athletic grounds in Japan, has been postponed. The management company has decided to use the ground mainly for football, and not to install a running track until the supplementary pitch has been added. Currently artificial turf is laid down all over the ground except the football field area, over which natural turf is spread. Consequently, there is some room between the football pitch and the stand.

In 2013, the athletics track was finally installed in order to host the National Sports Festival of Japan at the same year. However, the artificial turf is still used over the track for football matches.

In order to comply with height limitation close to the airport, the pitch is sunk below the level of the land around the stadium.

2019 Rugby World Cup

Access 
 Keiō Line: 5 minutes' walk from 
 Seibu Tamagawa Line: 20 minutes' walk from

References

External links 

  

Chōfu, Tokyo
College football venues
American football venues in Japan
Football venues in Japan
Rugby union stadiums in Japan
Rugby in Kantō
Sports venues in Tokyo
Tokyo Verdy
FC Tokyo
Multi-purpose stadiums in Japan
Venues of the 2020 Summer Olympics
Sports venues completed in 2001
2001 establishments in Japan
Olympic football venues
Olympic rugby venues
Olympic modern pentathlon venues